is a Japanese actress known for her role as Rena Yanase in 1996 Ultraman Tiga series. She won the best actress award at the 9th Japan Movie Professional Awards in 1999. She also starred the 1992 edition of "Christmas Express" commercials for the Central Japan Railway Company.

Early life 
On October 13 1971, Yoshimoto was born in Tokyo, Japan.
She is the eldest daughter of Susumu Kurobe who portrayed Shin Hayata in the 1966 Ultraman series.

Career 
In 1990s, Yoshimoto started her career in drama series and she was known for Ultraman Tiga, which led to the 1998 Ultraman Tiga movie.
In 2016, Yoshimoto was Tsukasa Tamaki in Ultraman X The Movie.

Personal life 
Yoshimoto was married in 2001 but divorced about four years later.
In 2010, Yoshimoto married again. In 2011, Yoshimoto's son was born. Yoshimoto currently lives in Ishigaki Island with her family.

Filmography

Movies

Drama series

References

External links
Tsuburaya Productions - The Official Home of Ultraman (Japanese)

Japanese film actresses
Japanese television actresses
1971 births
Living people
Actresses from Tokyo